Mryasovo (Meräś) is a rural locality (a village) in Novoburinsky Selsoviet, Krasnokamsky District, Bashkortostan, Russia. The population was 81 as of 2010. There are 3 streets.

Geography 
Mryasovo is located 60 km southeast of Nikolo-Beryozovka (the district's administrative centre) by road. Manyak is the nearest rural locality.

References 

Rural localities in Krasnokamsky District